Edwin Myrwyn Rowlands (April 1, 1901 – March 28, 1961) was a Welsh-American member of the Wisconsin State Assembly and the Wisconsin State Senate. He was born in Cambria, Wisconsin, the son of Emma (née Davies) and David Morris Rowlands, of Welsh descent. He had an elder brother, Morris.

Biography
On September 10, 1924, in Arkansas, he married Mary Allen Neal, who became an actress in her later years, and was known as Lady Rowlands. They had two children: a son, David, and a daughter, Virginia, who is best known as the Emmy Award-winning and Academy Award-nominated actress Gena Rowlands.

Rowlands served in the Assembly from 1927 to 1933 and in the Senate from 1935 to 1937. He was also Chairman of the Wisconsin Progressive Party.
 
Edwin Myrwyn Rowlands died in 1961 in Harris County, Texas, four days before his 60th birthday.

References

External links
The Political Graveyard

1901 births
1961 deaths
Members of the Wisconsin State Assembly
People from Cambria, Wisconsin
Wisconsin Progressives (1924)
Wisconsin state senators
American people of Welsh descent
20th-century American politicians